Searcy may refer to:

Places
Searcy, Arkansas, a town in White County, Arkansas, United States
Searcy Bay Conservation Park, a protected area in South Australia
Searcy County, Arkansas, a county in north-central Arkansas, United States
Searcy High School (Arkansas), a public high school in Searcy, Arkansas, United States
Searcy Hospital, a psychiatric hospital in Mount Vernon, Alabama
Searcy House (disambiguation), two structures listed on the National Register of Historic Places in Tuscaloosa County, Alabama, United States
Searcy Municipal Airport, an airport near Searcy, Arkansas, United States

People last name
Alfred Searcy, South Australian public servant and writer
Arthur Searcy, South Australian public servant
Da'Norris Searcy, American football safety for the Tennessee Titans of the National Football League (NFL)
Devin Searcy, American professional basketball player who currently plays for Rouen Métropole Basket of the French LNB Pro A
Ed Searcy, retired American professional basketball player
George Searcy, South Australian cricket Test match umpire
Leon Searcy, American football coach and former player
Lemuel Searcy, American politician
Nelson Searcy, American evangelical minister and author
Nick Searcy, American actor who currently portrays Chief Deputy United States Marshal Art Mullen on FX's Justified
Peter Searcy, musician from Louisville, Kentucky
R. B. Searcy, mayor of Huntsville, Alabama from 1952 to 1964
Robert Searcy (1921–2009), a member of the Tuskegee Airmen
Sam Searcy is a Democratic member of the North Carolina General Assembly
Steve Searcy is a former Major League Baseball pitcher

Searcy first names
Searcy Bracewell, member of the Texas Legislature from 1947 to 1959

Other
Searcys, British catering company